Synechodes agrippina is a moth in the family Brachodidae. It was described by Edward Meyrick in 1930. It is found on Sulawesi in Indonesia.

References

Brachodidae
Moths described in 1930